Dale Roberts may refer to:
Dale Roberts (baseball) (1942–2010), relief pitcher
Dale Roberts (footballer, born 1956) (1956–2003), former Ipswich Town centre-half
Dale Roberts (footballer, born 1986) (1986–2010), former England C and Rushden & Diamonds goalkeeper